Lessing is a German surname of Slavic origin, originally Lesnik meaning "woodman".

Lessing may refer to:

A German family of writers, artists, musicians and politicians who can be traced back to a Michil Lessigk mentioned in 1518 as being a linen weaver in Jahnsdorf near Chemnitz.
The family includes:
  (1693–1770) pastor primarus in Kamenz, well respected, published theologian, translator and father of Gotthold Ephraim Lessing (1729–1781) and Karl Gotthelf Lessing (1740–1812). Johann Gottfried's father Theophilus Lessing (1647–1735) was mayor of Kamenz and Robert Schumann's (the composer and pianist 1810–1856) four-times great uncle, Johanne Sophie Susanna Lessing (1745–1818 daughter of Carl Heinrich Lessing 1713, a trumpeter) his grandmother.
 Gotthold Ephraim Lessing (1729–1781), one of the most prominent philosophers of the Enlightenment era, recognised as the world's first dramaturg, Germany's first dramatist and comedy playwright, champion for religious tolerance, friend of Moses Mendelssohn, critic for the Vossische Zeitung, translator and Shakespearean scholar. Today his own works appear as prototypes of the later developed bourgeois German drama. Scholars generally see Miss Sara Sampson and Emilia Galotti as the first bourgeois tragedies, Minna von Barnhelm as the model for many classic German comedies, Nathan the Wise as the first German drama of ideas ("Ideendrama") and his theoretical writings Laokoon and Hamburg Dramaturgy set the standards for the discussion of aesthetic and literary theoretical principles.
 Carl Friedrich Lessing (1778–1848), son of Karl Gotthelf Lessing (1740–1812), published philosopher, chancellor under Prince Biron von Curland in Polnisch Wartenberg.
 Karl Friedrich Lessing (1808–1880), German painter, son of Carl Friedrich Lessing (1778–1848) and great nephew of Gotthold Ephraim Lessing (1729–1781), married to Ida Heuser niece of painter Henriette Jügel  and whose niece Malwine Schroedter (1847–1901) married painter and then director of the Academy of Arts, Berlin, Anton von Werner.
 Christian Friedrich Lessing (1809–1862, died and buried in Krasnoyarsk, Siberia), physician, botanist, writer, son of Carl Friedrich Lessing (1778–1848) and great nephew of Gotthold Ephraim Lessing (1729–1781)
 Franziska Fanny Maria Lessing (1818–1901), daughter of Carl Friedrich Lessing and great niece of Gotthold Ephraim Lessing (1729–1781), married to German painter  (1807–1884).
  (1827–1895), publicist, owner of the Vossische Zeitung and Schloss Meseberg, son of Carl Friedrich Lessing (1778–1848) and great nephew of Gotthold Ephraim Lessing (1729–1781).
  (1861–1919), son of Carl Robert Lessing (1827–1895), landowner and liberal politician.
 Otto Lessing (sculptor) (1846–1912), German sculptor, photographer and writer, gifted pianist, son of Karl Friedrich Lessing (1808–1880), married to Sigrid Gude, daughter of Norwegian painter Hans Gude.
 Bertha Lessing (1844–1914) daughter of Karl Friedrich Lessing (1808–1880), married to royal court actor and dramatist Karl Koberstein; their son Hans Koberstein became a painter.
  (1852–1916) landscape painter, son of Karl Friedrich Lessing (1808–1880).
  (1856–1930), painter, son of Karl Friedrich Lessing (1808–1880).
 Kolja Lessing (born 1961), five times great nephew of Gotthold Ephraim Lessing (1729–1781), German pianist, violinist, composer and music professor at the Stuttgart Musik Hochschule.

Lessing is also the surname of:
 Doris Lessing (1919–2013), British novelist and the 2007 Nobel Prize laureate in literature. once married to Gottfried Lessing
 Gottfried Lessing (1914–1979), German diplomat
 Erich Lessing (1923–2018), Austrian Magnum photographer
 Feodor Yulievich Levinson-Lessing (1861–1939), Russian geologist
 Kolja Lessing (born 1961), German violinist, pianist, composer and academic teacher
 Lawrence Lessing, US journalist
 Madge Lessing (1862-1935), English actress
 Roland Lessing (born 1978), Estonian biathlete
 Simon Lessing (born 1971), British athlete
 Theodor Lessing (1872–1933), German-Jewish philosopher

Similar names
 Lessig

References

German-language surnames